Adams Prize may refer to:

Herbert Baxter Adams Prize, of the American Historical Association
Adams Prize, by the University of Cambridge and St John's College for research in mathematics
Douglas Adams prize, in honor of Douglas Adams, given by St John's College for humorous writing